Gareeb is a surname and given name. Notable people with the name include:

Gareeb Stephen Shalfoon (1904–1953), New Zealand dance band musician and storekeeper 
Nabeel Gareeb, Pakistani-American businessman